The individual show jumping event, part of the equestrian program at the 2000 Summer Olympics, was held from 25 September to 1 October 2000 at the Sydney International Equestrian Centre 45 miles outside of Sydney, Australia. Like all other equestrian events, the jumping competition was mixed gender, with both male and female athletes competing in the same division. There were 74 competitors from 28 nations. Each nation could have up to 4 riders. The event resulted in a three-way tie for first and a medal jump-off. Dutch riders Jeroen Dubbeldam and Albert Voorn finished first and second in that jump-off, earning the Netherlands' first gold medal and second silver medal in individual jumping. Khaled Al Eid earned Saudi Arabia's first medal in the event with his bronze, finishing third in the jump-off.

Background

This was the 21st appearance of the event, which had first been held at the 1900 Summer Olympics and has been held at every Summer Olympics at which equestrian sports have been featured (that is, excluding 1896, 1904, and 1908). It is the oldest event on the current programme, the only one that was held in 1900.

Seven of the top 10 riders from the 1996 Games returned: silver medalist Wilhelm Melliger of Switzerland, bronze medalist Alexandra Ledermann of France, sixth-place finisher Geoff Billington of Great Britain, seventh-place finisher Jan Tops of the Netherlands (who had also finished in the top 10 in 1988 and 1992), eighth-place finisher Álvaro de Miranda Neto of Brazil, and ninth-place finishers Rodrigo de Paula Pessoa of Brazil and John Whitaker of Great Britain. 1992 Olympic gold medalist Ludger Beerbaum of Germany also returned. Pessoa was also the reigning World Champion and had finished in the top 10 at the 1992 Games; he was the favorite in Sydney.

Iran and Jordan each made their debut in the event. France competed for the 19th time, most of any nation.

Competition format

The competition used the five-round format introduced in 1992, with three rounds in the qualifying round and two rounds in the final. The one significant change from the previous Games was that the number of pairs advancing to the final increased from 25 to 45 but a mid-final cut was reintroduced, with only 20 pairs competing in the second half of the final.

For the qualifying round, each pair competed in three rounds. The total score across all three rounds counted for advancement to the individual final; the second and third rounds counted towards the team score. The individual competition allowed 45 pairs to advance to the final, though only three pairs per nation were allowed.

In the final, there were two rounds. All of the finalists competed in the first, but only the top 20 pairs competed again in the second round. The combined score for the two rounds was the result for those pairs. A jump-off would be used if necessary to break ties for medal positions; other ties would not be broken.

Schedule

All times are Australian Eastern Standard Time (UTC+10)

Results

Qualifying round

Round 1

Held Monday, 25 September 2000. The two riders who were eliminated during the round automatically received a score 20 points higher than the highest other score and continued to compete in the second round.

Round 2

The second qualifying round was also the first team round. Held Thursday, 28 September 2000.

Round 3

The third individual qualifier was also the second team round. All athletes competed individually regardless of their team's qualification. 45 pairs advanced to the final round. Only three pairs from any single NOC could advance. This led to four pairs being eliminated. Held Thursday, 28 September 2000.

Final round

Round A

All scores were reset to zero after the third qualifying round. Held Sunday, 1 October 2000. The top 20 riders and ties advanced to Round B of the finals.

Round B

The 12-way tie for 20th-place resulted in 31 pairs advancing to the second round of the final. A jump-off was required to break the ties for the medals.

Jump-off

References

Sources
 Official Report of the 2000 Sydney Summer Olympics available at https://web.archive.org/web/20060622162855/http://www.la84foundation.org/5va/reports_frmst.htm

Individual jumping